Palais des Sports, known also as the Palais des sports Pierre Mendes or "Le Stade Olympique de Glace" is an indoor ice hockey arena, located in Paul Mistral Park in Grenoble, France. The vaulted roof structure was built from November 1966 to April 1967, therefore having tough weather problems to add to construction difficulties. The stadium was conceived for the Olympiques Winter Games held in Grenoble in 1968 and has a capacity of up to 12,000 spectators.

Events

The figure skating events and some ice hockey games at the 1968 Winter Olympics were held at this arena called for the event Stade de glace.

The arena hosted the 1972 (3rd) European Athletics Indoor Championships over 11 and 12 March, the arena was featured on the medals awarded (pictured).

The arena hosted the 1979 FIBA European Champions Cup final in front of a crowd of 15,000, the 1983 final of the same competition and also the 1985 and 1988 Cup Winners' Cup final.

The arena hosted Bob Marley and the Wailers performance on 3 June 1980 in support of their Uprising Tour.

Structure
The structure consists of two crossing cylinders (95m by 65m). The double shell structure (6 cm thick) is a hyperbolic paraboloid which transfers the weight down its four resting points. In plan, the structure appears to be a square. At each corner is a 48m cantilever.

See also
 List of indoor arenas in France

References

9. Marrey, Bernard. Guide Rhône-Alpes de l'architecture du XXe siècle, 1914–2003. Paris: Picard, 2004. Print.

External links

 

Venues of the 1968 Winter Olympics
1982 Davis Cup
Sports venues in Grenoble
Indoor arenas in France
Indoor ice hockey venues in France
Velodromes in France
Olympic figure skating venues
Olympic ice hockey venues
Indoor track and field venues
Sports venues completed in 1967
1967 establishments in France